Brachystomellidae is a family of springtails in the order Poduromorpha. There are about 9 genera in Brachystomellidae.

Genera
These nine genera belong to the family Brachystomellidae:
 Bonetella Stach, 1949
 Brachygastrura Rapoport, 1962
 Brachystomella Agren, 1903
 Brachystomellides Arlé, 1959
 Cassagnella Najt & Massoud, 1974
 Salvarella Greenslade & Najt, 1987
 Setanodosa Salmon, 1942
 Subclavontella Stach, 1949
 † Bellingeria Christiansen & Pike, 2002

References

Further reading

 

Poduromorpha
Arthropod families